Elysius chimaera is a moth of the family Erebidae. It was described by Herbert Druce in 1893. It is found in southern Brazil and Paraguay.

References

chimaera
Moths described in 1893
Moths of South America